The Main road 830 is a short bypass direction Secondary class main road in Veszprém, that connects the Main road 82 in the eastern and Main road 8 western part of the city.

The road, as well as all other main roads in Hungary, is managed and maintained by Magyar Közút, state owned company.

Major junctions are with Route 62, Aradi Vértanúk utca, Tüzér utca, Pápai út and with Route 8. All in Veszprém.

See also

 Roads in Hungary

Sources

External links
 Hungarian Public Road Non-Profit Ltd. (Magyar Közút Nonprofit Zrt.)
 National Infrastructure Developer Ltd.

Main roads in Hungary
Veszprém County